Mark Scalf (born October 3, 1958) is an American college baseball coach and former player. He served as head coach of the UNC Wilmington Seahawks baseball program from 1992 to the conclusion of the 2019 season.

Background 
Scalf is a native of Cary, North Carolina and attended Cary High School. He is a four-time letter winner at second base for UNC Wilmington, from 1977 through 1980.  The Seahawks began play in Division I in Scalf's freshman year.

Coaching career
After completing his playing career, Scalf earned a graduate assistant coach position at North Carolina in 1981.  He became a full-time assistant the following season, helping the Tar Heels to two ACC Tournament titles, an ACC regular season championship, and two NCAA Tournament appearances in his three seasons in Chapel Hill.  In 1984, he returned to UNC Wilmington as an assistant to Bobby Guthrie. In the summer of 1985, he skippered the Wareham Gatemen of the Cape Cod Baseball League. In 1992, he succeeded Guthrie as head coach, and has since become the Seahawks all-time win leader.  Scalf has earned five Colonial Athletic Association Coach of the Year Awards, placed 45 players into the professional ranks, and served as an assistant coach on the 2003 and 2007 USA Baseball teams, both of which earned silver medals.

Head coaching record
This table shows Scalf's record as a head coach at the Division I level.

References

Living people
1958 births
Baseball second basemen
North Carolina Tar Heels baseball coaches
UNC Wilmington Seahawks baseball coaches
UNC Wilmington Seahawks baseball players
Cape Cod Baseball League coaches
People from Cary, North Carolina